American R&B singer Patti LaBelle has released eighteen studio albums, three live albums, fourteen compilation albums, and forty-seven singles. To date, LaBelle has sold 50 million records worldwide. According to RIAA, she has attained six gold and one platinum album in the United States. LaBelle has also charted forty-three hits on Billboard's Hot/R&B Hip-Hop Songs, 13 of which reached the Top 10. 

In 2015, Billboard ranked “Lady Marmalade” with the all-female group LaBelle as the 30th Biggest Girl Group song of all time on Billboard Hot 100. She has charted twenty albums on Billboard 200, two of which reached the Top 10 and one reaching the top. Winner In You is her most successful album to date with eight million copies sold worldwide, and about 900,000 copies were sold in the US in just seven weeks.

Albums

Studio albums

Live albums

Compilation albums

Singles
{| class="wikitable" style="text-align:center;"
|-
! rowspan="2"| Year
! rowspan="2"| Single
! colspan="11" | Peak chart positions
! rowspan="2"| Certifications
! rowspan="2"| Album
|-
! scope="col" style="width:3em;font-size:85%;"| US
! scope="col" style="width:3em;font-size:85%;"| USR&B
! scope="col" style="width:3em;font-size:85%;"| USDan
! scope="col" style="width:3em;font-size:85%;"| US Cashbox R&B
! scope="col" style="width:3em;font-size:85%;"| USA/C
! scope="col" style="width:3em;font-size:85%;"| AUS
! scope="col" style="width:3em;font-size:85%;"| CAN
! scope="col" style="width:3em;font-size:85%;"| IRE
! scope="col" style="width:3em;font-size:85%;"| NL
! scope="col" style="width:3em;font-size:85%;"| NZ
! scope="col" style="width:3em;font-size:85%;"| UK
|-
| 1977
| align="left"| "Joy to Have Your Love"
| —
| 31
| —
| 24
| —
| —
| —
| —
| —
| —
| —
|
| align=left rowspan="3"| Patti LaBelle
|-
| rowspan="4"| 1978
| align="left"| "You Are My Friend"
| —
| 61
| —
| 48
| —
| —
| —
| —
| —
| —
| —
|
|-
| align="left"| "Dan Swit Me"
| —
| —
| 29
| —
| —
| —
| —
| —
| —
| —
| —
|
|-
| align="left"| "Teach Me Tonight (Me Gusta Tu Baile)"
| —
| 51
| —
| 70
| —
| —
| —
| —
| —
| —
| —
|
| align=left rowspan="2"| Tasty
|-
| align="left"| "Little Girls"
| —
| 60
| —
| 61
| —
| —
| —
| —
| —
| —
| —
|
|-
| rowspan="2"| 1979
| align="left"| "It's Alright with Me"
| —
| 34
| —
| 19
| —
| —
| —
| —
| —
| —
| —
|
| align=left rowspan="2"| It's Alright with Me
|-
| align="left"| "Music Is My Way of Life"
| —
| 81
| 10
| 82
| —
| —
| —
| —
| —
| —
| —
|
|-
| rowspan="3"| 1980
| align="left"| "Release (The Tension)"
| —
| 61
| 48
| 53
| —
| —
| —
| —
| 12
| —
| —
|
| align=left rowspan="3"| Released
|-
| align="left"| "I Don't Go Shopping"
| —
| 26
| —
| 22
| —
| —
| —
| —
| —
| —
| —
|
|-
| align="left"| "Don't Make Your Angel Cry"
| —
| —
| —
| —
| —
| —
| —
| —
| —
| —
| —
|-
| rowspan="2"| 1981
| align="left"| "Rocking Pneumonia and the Boogie Woogie Flu"
| —
| —
| —
| —
| —
| —
| —
| —
| —
| —
| —
|
| align=left rowspan="2"| The Spirit's in It
|-
| align="left"| "The Spirit's in It"
| —
| —
| 49
| —
| —
| —
| —
| —
| —
| —
| —
|
|-
| 1982
| align="left"| "The Best Is Yet to Come" (with Grover Washington, Jr.)
| —
| 14
| —
| 14
| —
| —
| —
| —
| —
| —
| —
|
| align=left| The Best Is Yet to Come
|-
| rowspan="2"| 1983
| align="left"| "If Only You Knew" (A-side)
| 46
| 1
| —
| 1
| —
| —
| —
| —
| —
| —
| —
|
| align=left rowspan="2"| I'm in Love Again
|-
| align="left"| "I'll Never, Never Give Up" (B-side)
| —
| —
| 57
| —
| —
| —
| —
| —
| —
| —
| —
|
|-
| rowspan="3"| 1984
| align="left"| "Love Has Finally Come at Last" (with Bobby Womack)
| 88
| 3
| —
| 1
| —
| —
| —
| —
| —
| —
| —
|
| align=left| The Poet II
|-
| align="left"| "Love, Need and Want You"
| —
| 10
| —
| 6
| —
| —
| —
| —
| —
| —
| —
|
| align=left| I'm in Love Again
|-
| align="left"| "It Takes a Lot of Strength to Say Goodbye" (with Bobby Womack)
| —
| 76
| —
| —
| —
| —
| —
| —
| —
| —
| —
|
| align=left| The Poet II
|-
| rowspan="4"| 1985
| align="left"| "New Attitude"
| 17
| 3
| 1
| 10
| —
| 84
| —
| —
| —
| 30
| —
|
| align=left rowspan="2"| Beverly Hills Cop
|-
| align="left"| "Stir It Up"
| 41
| 5
| 18
| 10
| —
| —
| —
| —
| —
| —
| —
|
|-
| align="left"| "I Can't Forget You"
| —
| 63
| —
| 72
| —
| —
| —
| —
| —
| —
| —
|
| align=left rowspan="3"| Patti
|-
| align="left"| "Shy"
| —
| —
| —
| —
| —
| —
| —
| —
| —
| —
| —
|
|-
| rowspan="4"| 1986
| align="left"| "If You Don't Know Me by Now (Part 1)"
| —
| 79
| —
| —
| —
| —
| —
| —
| —
| —
| —
|
|-
| align="left"| "On My Own" (with Michael McDonald)
| 1
| 1
| —
| 1
| 2
| 12
| 1
| 1
| 1
| 4
| 2
|
 RIAA: Gold
 MC: Gold
 BPI: Silver
| align=left rowspan="4"| Winner in You
|-
| align="left"| "Oh, People"
| 29
| 7
| —
| 9
| —
| —
| 42
| 10
| 31
| 36
| 26
|
|-
| align="left"| "Kiss Away the Pain"
| —
| 13
| —
| 12
| —
| —
| —
| —
| —
| —
| —
|
|-
| rowspan="3"| 1987
| align="left"| "Something Special (Is Gonna Happen Tonight)"
| —
| 50
| 10
| 42
| —
| —
| —
| —
| —
| —
| —
|
|-
| align="left"| "The Last Unbroken Heart" (with Bill Champlin)
| —
| —
| —
| —
| 15
| —
| —
| —
| —
| —
| —
|
| align=left| Miami Vice II
|-
| align="left"| "Just the Facts"
| —
| 33
| —
| 35
| —
| —
| —
| —
| —
| —
| —
|
| align=left| Dragnet
|-
| rowspan="2"| 1989
| align="left"| "If You Asked Me To"
| 79
| 10
| —
| 8
| 11
| —
| —
| —
| —
| —
| —
|
| align=left rowspan="3"| Be Yourself
|-
| align="left"| "Yo Mister"
| —
| 6
| —
| 7
| —
| —
| —
| —
| 43
| —
| —
|
|-
| 1990
| align="left"| "I Can't Complain"
| —
| 65
| —
| 71
| —
| —
| —
| —
| —
| —
| —
|
|-
| rowspan="3"| 1991
| align="left"| "Superwoman" (with Gladys Knight & Dionne Warwick)  
| —
| 19
| —
| 30
| —
| —
| —
| —
| —
| —
| —
|
| align=left| Good Woman
|-
| align="left"| "Feels Like Another One"
| —
| 3
| 17
| 3
| —
| —
| —
| —
| —
| —
| —
|
| align=left rowspan="4"| ''Burnin|-
| align="left"| "Somebody Loves You Baby (You Know Who It Is)"
| —
| 2
| —
| 2
| —
| —
| —
| —
| —
| —
| —
|
|-
| rowspan="3"| 1992
| align="left"| "When You've Been Blessed (Feels Like Heaven)"
| —
| 4
| —
| 2
| —
| —
| —
| —
| —
| —
| —
|
|-
| align="left"| "When You Love Somebody (Saving My Love for You)"
| —
| 70
| —
| 33
| —
| —
| —
| —
| —
| —
| —
|
|-
| align="left"| "All Right Now"
| —
| 30
| —
| 32
| —
| —
| —
| —
| —
| —
| —
|
| align=left| Live!
|-
| 1993
| align="left"| "With Your Hand upon My Heart" (with Michael Crawford)
| —
| —
| —
| —
| —
| 59
| —
| —
| —
| —
| —
|
| align=left| A Touch of Music in the Night
|-
| rowspan="2"| 1994
| align="left"| "The Right Kinda Lover"
| 61
| 8
| 1
| 5
| —
| —
| —
| —
| —
| —
| 50
|
| align=left rowspan="3"| Gems
|-
| align="left"| "All This Love"
| —
| 42
| —
| 31
| —
| —
| —
| —
| —
| —
| —
|
|-
| 1995
| align="left"| "I Never Stopped Loving You"
| —
| 67
| —
| 40
| —
| —
| —
| —
| —
| —
| —
|
|-
| rowspan="2"| 1997
| align="left"| "When You Talk About Love"
| 56
| 12
| 1
| n/a
| —
| —
| —
| —
| —
| 50
| —
|
| align=left rowspan="3"| Flame
|-
| align="left"| "Shoe Was on the Other Foot"
| —
| 35
| 10
| n/a
| —
| —
| —
| —
| —
| —
| —
| align=left|
|-
| 1998
| align="left"| "Someone Like You" 
| —
| 43
| —
| n/a
| —
| —
| —
| —
| —
| —
| —
|
|-
| rowspan="2"| 2000
| align="left"|"Too Many Tears, Too Many Times"
| —
| —
| —
| n/a
| —
| —
| —
| —
| —
| —
| —
|
| align=left rowspan="3"| When a Woman Loves
|-
| align="left"| "Call Me Gone"
| —
| —
| —
| n/a
| —
| —
| —
| —
| —
| —
| —
|
|-
| 2001
| align="left"| "Why Do We Hurt Each Other"
| —
| —
| —
| n/a
| —
| —
| —
| —
| —
| —
| —
|
|-
| rowspan="2"| 2003
| align="left"| "Way Up There"
| —
| —
| —
| n/a
| —
| —
| —
| —
| —
| —
| —
|
| align=left| Church: Songs of Soul & Inspiration
|-
| align="left"| "You Are Everything" (with Terry Steele)
| —
| —
| —
| n/a
| —
| —
| —
| —
| —
| —
| —
|
| align=left| Day by Day
|-
| rowspan="2"| 2004
| align="left"| "New Day"
| 93
| 36
| 11
| n/a
| —
| —
| —
| —
| —
| —
| —
|
| align=left| Timeless Journey
|-
| align="left"| "Gotta Go Solo" (with Ronald Isley)
| 89
| 31
| —
| n/a
| —
| —
| —
| —
| —
| —
| —
|
| 
|-
| 2005
| align="left"| "Ain't No Way" (with Mary J. Blige)
| —
| 62
| —
| n/a
| —
| —
| —
| —
| —
| —
| —
|
| align=left| Classic Moments
|-
| 2006
| align="left"| "When Love Begins" (with Yolanda Adams)
| —
| 68
| —
| n/a
| —
| —
| —
| —
| —
| —
| —
|
| align=left rowspan="2"| The Gospel According To Patti LaBelle
|-
| 2007
| align="left"| "Anything" (with Mary Mary, Kanye West & Consequence)
| —
| 64
| —
| n/a
| —
| —
| —
| —
| —
| —
| —
|
|-
| colspan="16" style="font-size:90%" | "—" denotes a recording that did not chart or was not released in that territory.
|}Notes Did not chart on the Hot R&B/Hip-Hop Songs charts (Billboard rules at the time prevented album cuts from charting). Chart peak listed represents the Hot R&B/Hip-Hop Airplay chart.

Billboard ChartsAdult R&B AirplayHot R&B/Hip-Hop Singles SalesMainstream R&B/Hip-Hop AirplayR&B Digital Song SalesDance Singles SalesGospel AirplayGospel Digital Song SalesLabelle (1962-1976)
The group was known as The Blue Belles (a.k.a. Patti La Belle and Her Blue Belles; Patti LaBelle and the Bluebelles) from 1962 to 1970, changing their name to simply Labelle in 1971.

Studio albums

Live albums
Sweethearts of the Apollo (1963, Newtown)
The Bluebelles on Stage (1965, Parkway)

Compilation albums
Golden Classics (1993, Collectables)
Over the Rainbow: The Atlantic Years (1994, Ichiban)
Lady Marmalade: The Best of Patti and Labelle (1995, Legacy/Epic)
Something Silver (1997, Warner Bros.)
The Best of the Early Years (1999, Hip-O)
The Anthology (2017, SoulMusic)Singles'''

 "I Sold My Heart to the Junkman" was first recorded by The Starlets but was credited as The Blue Bells.

Other appearances

References

Rhythm and blues discographies
Discographies of American artists
Pop music discographies
Soul music discographies